Christina Cameron  (born 1945), is a Canadian scientific writer, a former public servant and, from 2005 to 2019, a professor of Heritage conservation and World Heritage. Cameron has been awarded the prestigious Public Service Outstanding Achievement Award, inducted as a Fellow into the Royal Society of Canada, was the 2014 recipient of the National Trust for Canada's Gabrielle Léger Medal for Lifetime Achievement, and was appointed to the Order of Canada in 2014. In 2018 she was awarded the Gérard-Morisset Prix du Québec. One of her former superiors, a chief executive officer of Parks Canada, said that she was "unquestionably the great lady of Canada's cultural heritage."

Biography

In 1969 Cameron moved to Quebec City where she was hired by Parks Canada to make an inventory of the city's historic buildings under the Canadian Inventory of Historic Building program. Her five-year assignment fuelled her passion for the architectural heritage of Quebec.

Since the 1970s, she has published extensively and presented many papers on Canadian architecture, heritage management and World Heritage.

She has served on the grants committee of the Getty Conservation Institute and has been involved in an international values-based heritage management project sponsored by the Institute.

Cameron held a senior civil servant position for Heritage Canada in the 1990s, when she enforced conservation policies. Cameron held the position of Director General of National Historic Sites and Secretary of the Historic Sites and Monuments Board of Canada. She worked for 35 years on behalf of the Canadian Public Service.

In 1990 Cameron was appointed Head of the Canadian Delegation to the World Heritage Committee, a position she held until 2008. She was appointed president of the delegation in 1990 and 2008.

In 2007 Cameron was appointed Chair of the World Heritage Committee.

In 2008 she received the Government of Canada's Outstanding Achievement Award, the "highest honor of excellence in the federal public service".

In 2012 Cameron held the Canada Research Chair in Architectural Heritage at the University of Montreal's School of Architecture. She was also vice-president of the Canadian Commission of UNESCO.

Publications

Taken from the Centre for Studies and International Research of the University of Montreal.

References

Living people
Members of the Order of Canada
Université Laval alumni
University of Toronto alumni
Brown University alumni
Writers from Toronto
Year of birth uncertain
Fellows of the Royal Society of Canada
Canadian women non-fiction writers
Canadian science writers
Canadian architecture writers
1945 births